A haunted house is a building purported to be the site of paranormal activity.

Haunted house may also refer to:

Haunted attraction (simulated), a venue that simulates the experience of paranormal activity for thrills or amusement

Films and television
 The Haunted House (1913 film), an American silent short comedy-drama 
 The Haunted House (1917 film), an American film directed by Albert Parker
 The Haunted House (1921 film), a comedy short starring Buster Keaton
 The Haunted House, a 1922 American silent horror/comedy film directed by Erle C. Kenton
 The Haunted House (1928 film), starring Larry Kent and Thelma Todd
 The Haunted House (1929 film), a Mickey Mouse cartoon
 Haunted House, a 1940 film featuring Buddy Swan
 Haunted House, a 2004 American film edited by Alan Roberts
 Haunted House (2004 film), a computer animated short film shown in 3D and 4D cinemas
 The Haunted House (2005 film), a Khmer horror film
 A Haunted House, a 2013 American parody film
 La casa stregata, a 1982 Italian film starring Gloria Guida
  (anime), a Tooniverse animated television series

Games 
 Haunted House (arcade game), a 1972 electro-mechanical arcade game
 Haunted House (pinball), a 1982 pinball machine
 Haunted House (video game), a 1982 video game for the Atari 2600
 Haunted House, a 2010 video game for the Wii, see List of Wii games
 Haunted House: Cryptic Graves, a 2014 video game for PC
 Haunted House, a text adventure game for the TRS-80, see List of TRS-80 games
 Haunted House, a 1962 board game by Marvin Glass and Associates
 Which Witch? (board game) or Haunted House, a 1970 board game by Milton-Bradley

Literature
 Haunted House (manga), a 2002 manga by Mitsukazu Mihara
 "The Haunted House" (story), an 1859 "portmanteau" story by Charles Dickens and others
 A Haunted House and Other Short Stories, a 1944 story collection by Virginia Woolf
 Mostellaria or The Haunted House, a play by Plautus
 Haunted House, a children's pop-up book by Jan Pieńkowski
 "The Haunted House", a lost story by H. P. Lovecraft, see H. P. Lovecraft bibliography#Juvenilia

Music
 Haunted House Ice Cream, a UK ice cream brand
 "Haunted House", a 1964 hit song by Jumpin' Gene Simmons
 "Haunted House", a song by The Bee Gees from the 1993 album Size Isn't Everything
 Haunted House (EP), a 2013 EP by Knife Party
 Haunted House, a musical partnership by Paul Hartnoll and Lianne Hall
 "The Haunted House", a song by Irving Berlin
 "Haunted House", a song by Mckenna Grace
 "Haunted House", a 2019 song by Florence and the Machine

See also

The Ultimate Haunted House, a 1994 computer adventure game

 Haunted Homes, UK TV show
 Haunted mansion (disambiguation)
 Ghost House (disambiguation)